State Council for Technical Education & Vocational Training (SCTE & VT) is located in the city of Bhubaneswar, Odisha, India. The board is managing the Diploma & ITI education in Orissa, which is affiliated to AICTE, New Delhi, recognized by Government of Odisha.
According to SCTE & VT, there are almost 124 private and 35 state government diploma colleges in the Odisha state which include polytechnic, Diploma institutes & 637 ITI institutes, prevailing under this board, which produces skilled laborers & techno-entrepreneurial workforces for State SMEs industry.

Courses offered for Diploma
State Council for Technical Education & Vocational Training (SCTE & VT) gives 3 years of Diploma for regular & 2 year Diploma for lateral entry, with engineering courses and non engineering courses of:

Automobile Engineering
Architectural Assistant-ship
Civil Engineering
Electrical Engineering
Chemical Engineering
Mechanical Engineering
Applied Electronics & Instrumentation Engineering
Food Engineering
Electronics & Telecommunication Engineering
Computer Science & Engineering
IT Engineering
Mining Engineering
Metallurgical Engineering
Ceramic engineering
Biotechnology
Mechatronics Engineering
Pharmacy
Modern Office Management
Beauty Culture
 Hotel Management & Catering Technology (HM&CT)

More over SCTE & VT offers 3 years course for Diploma in Film and Television at Biju Pattanaik Film and Television Institute of Odisha (BPFTIO), Cuttack with specialization of:

Cinematography
 Sound and TV Engineering
 Film and Video Editing

Since year 2017 SCTE & VT has tied up with polytechnics of other state of India especially West Bengal with approval of MHRD to offer courses related to  Print, Multi-Media Technology and Photography to selected students who are interested during counselling and admission process for the courses offered at Regional Institute of Printing Technology, Kolkata.

Courses offered for ITI
State Council for Technical Education & Vocational Training (SCTE & VT) gives 1 and 2 years of Craftsman Training Scheme (CTS) with ITI training for regular ITI courses of Engineering and Non Engineering Trades of:

Electrician
Welder (Gas & Electric)
Electronic Mechanic
Fitter
Driver-cum-Mechanic
Carpenter
Instrument Mechanic
Data Entry Operator
Civil Draughtsman
Refrigerator and AC Mechanic
Information and Communication Technology system Mechanic
Motor Vehicle Mechanic
Laboratory Assistant
Plastic Processing Operator
Pump Mechanic
Die and Tool Maker
Foundry man Technician
Plumber
Diesel Mechanic
Tractor Mechanic
Lift and Escalator Mechanic
Vessel Navigator
Fabrication
Production and Manufacturing
Sewing Technology
Dress Making
Food and Vegetable Processing
Stenographer
Computer Operator 
Baker and Confectioner

Admission process 
Students are admitted into polytechnic, diploma, ITI training and craftsman training through web portal of Student Academic Management System SAMS (e-Admission  process) which is maintained by Department of skill development and technical education under Department of Higher Education, Odisha government of Odisha state for ITI  and Diploma engineering and non engineering admission.

List of State Government Run Diploma & Poly technical Colleges 
There are 35 state government run Diploma & Poly-technique colleges in Orissa.

See also
Directorate of Technical Education & Training

References

External links 
 Official sctevt odisha website

 
.
Vocational education in India
1976 establishments in Orissa